Champ-sur-Drac is a commune in the Isère department in southeastern France. It is situated at the foot of the Alps, at the confluence of the Romanche and the Drac. Its population was 3,007 in 2017. It is part of the Grenoble urban unit (agglomeration).

Population

Sister city
  Torviscosa, Italy (since 2006).

See also
Communes of the Isère department

References

Champsurdrac